Athirapilly Falls, is situated  in Athirapilly  Panchayat in Chalakudy Taluk of Thrissur District in  Kerala, India on the Chalakudy River, which originates from the upper reaches of the Western Ghats at the entrance to the Sholayar ranges. It is the largest waterfall in Kerala, which stands tall at 81.5 feet. Just a short drive from Athirapilly to the Vazhachal falls, which is close to dense green forests that are home to many endangered and endemic species of flora and fauna.

There is another waterfall on the way from Athirapilly to Vazhachal Falls, in close proximity to the road, which is locally called "Charpa Falls". Athirappilly Falls is the largest waterfall in Kerala and is nicknamed "The Niagara of South India".

Controversy about a state-proposed hydroelectric dam on the Chalakudy River above the waterfalls began in the 1990s and continued through 2017.

River

The river starts off smooth but becomes more turbulent as it nears Athirapilly. At Athirappilly Falls, the water surges around big rocks and cascades down in three separate plumes. Below the falls, the river remains turbulent for about  until it reaches Kannamkuzhi, from where it calms and flows smooth until reaching the dam at Thumpoormuzhi.

Wildlife
Forest wildlife in the area includes the Indian elephant, Bengal tiger, Indian leopard, gaur, sambar, and lion-tailed macaque. The unique  elevation riparian forest in the Athirappilly-Vazhachal area is the only location where all four South Indian species of hornbills — the great hornbill (the state bird of Kerala), Malabar pied hornbill, Malabar grey hornbill, and the Indian grey hornbill are found living together.

Plantations in the area contain teak, bamboo, and eucalyptus. Environmentalists claim that Athirappilly is a one-of its-kind riparian ecosystem in Kerala. V.S. Vijayan, Chairman of the Kerala State Biodiversity Board and former Director of the Salim Ali Centre for Ornithology and Natural History (SACON), Coimbatore, has been quoted in Down to Earth magazine as affirming that the Vazhachal forest division is the second most biodiverse area in the State. The International Bird Association has declared it an ‘Important Bird Area' and the Asian Nature Conservation Foundation has recommended that the area should be declared a sanctuary or a national park, he points out. The Wildlife Trust of India says it represents one of India's best elephant conservation efforts. "Any disruption to this fragile ecosystem will spell disaster," says Vijayan.
 The river provides habitat for 85 species of fresh water fishes. Among these, 35 are endemic species.

Tourism

The railway station nearest Athirappilly Falls is 30 kilometres (19 mi) to the west in Chalakkudy Railway Station, and the nearest airport is Cochin International Airport, about 55 kilometres (34 mi) southwest of the waterfall and 58 kilometres (36 mi) south of City of Thrissur. Athirappilly is easily reachable from Chalakkudy by taxi or by bus from the Chalakkudy bus terminal. Athirappilly is situated on a state highway connecting Tamil Nadu and Kerala, in a thick forest and so night travel is not permitted. The checkpoints at either ends close by 6:30 pm IST prior to which all vehicles have to exit through either checkpoints.

The journey from Chalakkudy to the Athirappilly Falls passes through a landscape of winding roads, small villages and lush green trees. Visitors can reach the top of the waterfall via a paved path that leads through thick bamboo clusters . From Angamaly, the route is in the midst of an Oil Palm Reserve at Ezhattumugham tourism village. A steep narrow path or a wide staired path can be taken to the bottom of the falls. The falls attract visitors from across India, especially during the monsoon months (June–September). About 7 million tourists visit the falls and the Vazhachal picnic spot each year.

Jungle safari 

Daily jungle safari trips are organized by Thrissur District Tourism Promotion Council with Athirappilly Destination Management Council from Chalakudy to Malakkappara.

Movies
Athirappilly falls has been used as a location for several Malayalam films as well as in other regional language films in India

 The fall is featured in old Malayalam movie Ponnapuram Kotta  (1973), specially the song "Valliyoor Kaavile", starring Prem Nasir, Vijayasree.
 Scenes from the Malayalam movie Vanadevatha (1976) starring Prem Nazir, Madhushala
 Scenes from the Malayalam movie Anuragi (1988) starring Mohanlal, Urvashi (actress)
 A major portion of the 1986 Tamil movie Punnagai Mannan was shot near the falls, the falls itself playing a role in it. It made the falls so popular in Tamil Nadu that it got the nickname "Punnagai Mannan Falls".
 The song "Koyaliya Gati Hai Payaliya Chhankati Hai" from the film "Jungle Love (film)" in 1990
 The falls were featured in Mani Ratnam's film Dil Se.., starring Shahrukh Khan, Manisha Koirala, and Preity Zinta, and featuring the song "Jiya Jale/Nenjinile".
 The falls are also famous as a site location for "Narumugaye Narumugaye", a song from the Tamil film Iruvar, acted by Mohanlal and actress Aishwarya Rai.
 This waterfall is also a major location for songs like "Behne de" and most scenes in the Hindi film Raavan and Tamil film Raavanan.
 The song "Adada Mazhaida" from Paiyaa featuring Karthi and Tamannaah was shot in this location.
 The song from Kannathil Muthamittal of the same name was shot here.
 The song "Kurukku Siruthavale" from Mudhalvan starring Arjun Sarja and Manisha Koirala, and "Chalo Chalain Mitwa" from its 2001 remake Nayak, starring Anil Kapoor and Rani Mukerji
 The song "Sunta hai tera khuda" from Pukar, starring Anil Kapoor
 The song "Achi lagti ho" from Kuch Naa Kaho
 The song "Kudamullakkadavil" from the malayalam film Vellithira (2003 film) starring Prithviraj Sukumaran, Navya Nair
 Climax scenes from Lajja (film) starring "Ajay Devgn", "Manisha Koirala"
 Sirf Tum, starring Sanjay Kapoor and Sushmita Sen
 A song in tamil movie Samurai (2002 film) starring Vikram (actor)
 Songs from Saaya (2003), starring John Abraham
 A scene from Madras Cafe starring John Abraham
 The song from tamil movie Maanasthan starring R. Sarathkumar, Sakshi Shivanand
 Scenes from Anandabhadram starring Manoj K Jayan, Prithviraj Sukumaran
 Song from 4 the People starring Bharath, Gopika
 A scene from the Hindi movie Mela (2000 film)
 The opening scene of the tamil movie Kandukondain Kandukondain 
 A few scenes in the Hindi movie Agyaat
 A scene from the Tamil movie Villu
 Few scenes from the Malayalam movie Manjeeradhwani (1998) starring Vineeth, Sakshi Sivanand
 The song "Bambara Kannu" from Tamil movie Madhurey
 A scene from the Tamil movie Vettaikaaran (2009 film)
 The song "Rosappoo chinna rosappoo" from Suryavamsam
 "Arjuna Arjuna", a song featuring R. Sarathkumar and Namitha in the movie Aei, was shot here.
 "Evo Evevo", a song from telugu film Lovely (2012 film)
 The song "Baarish" and climax scenes from Yaariyan (2014)
 The song "Oru kannil vegam" from Samar (2013)
 The song "Oh kamini" and a scene from Rang Rasiya
 The Telugu movie Brindavanam (2010)
 The song "Egire Mabbullona" from Happy (2006), Telugu and Malayalam
 The song "Ayyo Ayyo Dhanayya" from Ready (2008)
 Scenes from the Tamil movie Alex Pandian
 The song "Aaayi re aayi re khushi" from Khushi (2003, Hindi), starring Kareena Kapoor
 The title song of the Hindi movie Chura Liyaa Hai Tumne
 The song "Sha La La" from the movie Ghilli (2004) starring Trisha (actress) and Vijay (actor)
 The song "Vaana Chinukulu" from the Telugu movie Seethamma Vakitlo Sirimalle Chettu
 The English movie Before the Rains (2007)
 The English movie Pirate's Blood (2008)
 The song "Thuppakki Penne" from the movie Peranmai (2009) starring Jayam Ravi and Sai Dhanshika
 Scenes from the Malayalam movie Cousins
 Scenes and a song from Baahubali, India's biggest motion picture, a 2015 Tamil/Telugu bilingual movie
 The Tamil movie Puli (2015)
 "Rock On Bro", a song from Janatha Garage (2016, Telugu)
 A song "Unnavitta Yaarum Yenakilla" from the film Seemaraja starring Sivakarthikeyan and Samantha Ruth Prabhu
 A scene from Malayalam movie Odiyan (2018) starring Mohanlal
 A song from Telugu movie Husharu (2018) starring Tejus Kancherla and Priya Vadlamani
 "He's So Cute", a song from Sarileru Neekevvaru (2020, Telugu) starring Mahesh Babu, Rashmika Mandanna
 A scene from Telugu movie Sye Raa Narasimha Reddy starring Chiranjeevi
 Scenes from the Telugu movie Pushpa: The Rise
 Climax scene from the Tamil movie Kaathuvaakula Rendu Kaadhal (2022) starring Vijay Sethupathi, Nayanthara and Samantha Ruth Prabhu

Hydroelectric project

In 1994, the Kerala State Electricity Board (KSEB) proposed a 163 megawatt Athirappilly Hydro Electric Project. It was to include a dam 23 metres (75 ft) high and 311 metres (1,020 ft) wide on the Chalakudy River in the Vazhachal Forest Division about 5 kilometres (3 mi) upstream of Athirappilly Falls and 400 metres (1,312 ft) upstream of Vazhachal Rapids (Vazhachal Falls). However, environmental groups and people's collectives opposed the project on grounds that it would damage the environment, infringe on human rights, and threaten tourism. Though it was not their main concern, critics also noted that if the entire course of the river were diverted to make electricity, the Athirappilly-Vazhachal waterfalls could dry up. To avoid damaging the falls, the KSEB proposed adjusting the water releases to maintain the falls. The debate continued in 2007. Environmentalists also expressed concern over whether the proposed hydroelectric project at Athirappilly waterfalls would lead to displacement and eventual extinction of the primitive tribal group, 'Kadars,' in the area.

In 2005, the Kerala Ministry of Environment and Forests approved the project on the basis of a report by Water and Power Consultancy Services (India) Ltd. (WAPCOS), an environmental impact assessment (EIA) agency. In 2006, the Kerala High Court quashed the clearance and ordered another public hearing. The debate continued the following years.

On 29 January 2011, the chairman of the Western Ghats Ecology Expert Panel (WGEEP) Madhav Gadgil opined that the Environment Impact Assessment (EIA) of the Athirappilly hydel power project was not properly carried out and 70% of it is bogus. The panel, appointed by the Union Ministry of Environment and Forests, was asked to look into and give recommendations on various projects in the Western Ghats such as the hydroelectric projects in Gundiya in Karnataka and Athirappilly in Kerala and the overall development projects in Ratnagiri and Sindhudurg districts of Maharashtra. Gadgil said that the proposed Athirappilly hydro-electric project cannot be approved until the Forest Rights Act is implemented in its true spirit for the Kadar tribal community of the area and also no comprehensive study had been carried out so far on the natural riparian forest vegetation along the Western Ghats.
On 14 June 2011, Union Minister for Environment and Forests Jairam Ramesh said his ministry would not grant approval to the Athirappilly hydro electric project. The minister also stated “When states are denied such projects on larger and long-term environmental considerations, they are entitled to some sort of green bonus,”
The first part of WGEEP report was submitted to the Ministry on August 31. The Western Ghats Ecology Expert Panel (WGEEP), on Sep 6th 2011 recommended to the Union Ministry of Environment and Forests against granting permission to carry out any construction activities at the sensitive Athirappilly-Vazhachal region. The panel, which submitted its report to Union Environment Minister Jayanti Natarajan in the capital, named Athirappilly as one of the 18 eco-sensitive localities (ESL) in the state. 
But K. Radhakrishnan, a former member (generation), KSEB, has opined that this panel report was highly biased with vested interests and the project was eco-friendly doing minimum damage to environment and forests because KSEB itself has its own vested interests if the Dam Project takes life . While there are reports from renowned experts from Kerala State Biodiversity Board that the power project would adversely affect the ecology of the area and the estimated power output would be dependable upon the rainfall and dry summer seasons, which is undependable in its own way. M. Sivasankar, a KSEB chairman and MD states the need of more environment-friendly power projects with lower operating cost and higher output like super critical boiler plants.

See also
 Vazhachal Falls
 Charpa Falls
 List of waterfalls in India
 List of waterfalls in India by height

Notes and references

External links

 Prince Charles, celebrated his 65th birthday in Athirappilly
 Visiting Athirapilly Waterfalls - What to Know
 Chalakudy River Protection Forum (CPF)
 Athirappilly - Vazhachal - Thumboormuzhi - Destination Management Council
 Official Site: www.thrissur.nic.in
 Athirappilly Projects 
 Vanishing falls
 Protests mark hearing on Athirappilly project
 Salim Ali Foundation

Waterfalls of Thrissur district
Tourism in Kerala